The Bordentown Secondary was originally a freight railroad line in New Jersey, running from Pavonia Yard in Camden to Trenton. Today, a large portion of the line from Bordentown to Camden is used for New Jersey Transit's River Line light rail service. Conrail Shared Assets Operations continues to operate freight trains on the line, but these operations are restricted to overnight hours. 

The line that meets with the Bordentown Secondary in Bordentown, the Robbinsville Industrial Track is operated by Conrail Shared Assets Operations and extends from Bordentown to nearby Yardville, New Jersey which is located within Hamilton Township.

History

The trackage that makes up much of the present-day Bordentown Secondary was originally laid by the Camden and Amboy Railroad in the 19th century. The line completed the connection between New York City and Philadelphia, via ferries between Pier 1 in New York, and South Amboy, New Jersey, and between Camden and Philadelphia. The Camden and Amboy was eventually purchased by the Pennsylvania Railroad (PRR), then became a Penn Central Transportation line after the PRR-New York Central Railroad merger in 1968, and was transferred to Conrail in 1976.

The line was purchased by New Jersey Transit in 1999 for its River Line light rail service between Trenton and Camden. As part of the deal, Conrail retains trackage rights over the line.

Today

At present, the line is primarily used for the River Line service, which operates on the same tracks used by freight trains for much of its route. To achieve Federal Railroad Administration approval for the operation, light rail and freight operations are time separated. Conrail's agreement with New Jersey Transit gives exclusive access to light rail operations from 6:00 AM to 10:00 PM Sunday through Friday. Conrail has exclusive access for freight service during the overnight hours, but may run trains on the southern end of the alignment any other time with prior approval from New Jersey Transit or in emergencies.

Much of the line between Bordentown and South Amboy is out of service; the track has been pulled up or paved over in several places. In February 2006, the New Jersey Department of Transportation proposed removing two road crossings on the northern portion of the line. Whats left of the remaining line that ran between Bordentown and South Amboy which is currently called the Robbinsville Industrial Track now stops in the Yardville section of Hamilton Township, New Jersey.

References
 The Trentonian, Feb. 17, 2006.
 Railroad history database

External links
 Bordentown Secondary mileposts

Conrail lines
Pennsylvania Railroad lines
Rail transportation in New Jersey